Holdridge's toad (Incilius holdridgei), formerly Bufo holdridgei, is a species of toad endemic to Costa Rica. In October 2008, it was declared extinct by the International Union for Conservation of Nature in its Red List since the species had not been seen since 1987, despite years of extensive searches. However, the species was rediscovered in 2010 by a Costa Rican herpetologist and is now classified as critically endangered. It is believed that the species is most threatened by the presence of the chytrid fungus in its habitat.

Description

Taxonomy
Originally found on Barva Volcano in Cordillera Central, Costa Rica, the Holdridge's toad is still endemic to that particular small area of Costa Rica's rainforests. It is named after the research scientist Holdridge for its discovery.  It can be distinguished in classification from other toads by its morphological differences. For example, Incilius holdridgei differs from Incilius fastidiosus because of the different cranial crests and from Incilius peripetates due to the different sizes at the adult age.

Morphology
The adult male is between 32 and 46 mm snout vent length (SVL). The adult female is slightly larger, measuring between 38 and 53 mm SVL. Both the male and female have similar dorsum coloration ranging from black to light brown with a lighter colored venter. The limbs, as well as the dorsal and lateral surfaces are spotted with reddish warts of varying sizes.  The head is broad with low crests, excluding the thicker supratympanic crest. The reddish colored parotoid gland is smooth and globular. Limbs are shortened and feature fleshy hands and feet that are moderately webbed and lack tubercles.  Both males and females of the species lack structures of the ear, causing deafness.  Males lack vocal slits and sac, and have unusually hypertrophied testes.

Incilius holdridgei  tadpoles are small in size with ovoid-shaped bodies that are dark brown in color and feature a lighter venter surface. The tail and caudal fins are rounded. The mouth is directed ventrally and the oral disc has beaks and 2 to 3 rows of denticles which are bordered by a row of large papillae.

Behavior
Incilius holdridgei  are fossorial, and remain relatively inactive while burrowed underground. During seasons of heavy rain, they can be found underneath layers of forest floor debris. During dryer periods, they can be found near stream banks. Members of the species become more active during the daytime when they are above ground  or crepuscular time.  Due to their morphology, Incilius holdridgei are deaf and mute; they apparently do not communicate through sound or have mating calls- a rarity among frogs and toads. Before 1986, the species had been relatively easy to spot during its two-month mating season from April to May when males and females became more active and gathered in the hundreds. However, outside of the mating season, the toads were very difficult to locate. Since 1987, the species has declined in numbers and currently exists in a critically endangered state. Since it was re-discovered in 2010, just few individuals have seen again, for that reason this species is one of the most threatened in the world.

Habitat
Holdridge's toads have been mainly observed in the rainforests of the Central Mountain Range of Costa Rica. The species has recently been found living in open grassy areas. The Holdridge's Toad is a species that exists in montane rainforest of Costa Rica. This class of toads settles below the surfaces’ rubbish inside the forest during the duration of excessive rainfall. They are classified as a fossorial species due to the act of digging or burrowing themselves. When they are not avoiding the heavy rainfall, they favor massy stream banks.
The forest, wetlands, and/or pasturelands are sufficient enough for the Holdridge's Toad.

Diet
Due to the fact that the Holdridge's toad is reappearing from assumed extinction, research is beginning on this small organism. Revival of past research gives current research scientists direction of what to discover and learn from this toad. From collected past and new research along, as the Holdridge's is exposed to Costa Rica's rainforests’ bacteria and fungus, the diet can be inferred. The Holdridge's toads' diet includes a broad range of arthropod invertebrates, among them spiders, larval stages of moths and butterflies (lepidopterans), flies, beetles, earwigs (dermoptera), ants, and mites (Savage 2002).

Reproduction
The average age for sexual maturity of Incilius holdridgei is probably about two years. Due to the lack of development of vocal slits and tympana Incilius holdridgei do not have a breeding call. This species is an explosive breeder that lays clutches of large eggs in pools of water on the forest floor, they are also known to lay eggs in man-made drainage ditches. Historically however, Incilius holdridgei were known to breed in more open areas such as pastures, but due to habitat conservation efforts these pastures are now evolving back into forests. The males are known to arrive to these breeding pools following periods of heavy rain around early to mid-April and wait for the arrival of the females. At one time there were so many of them that some of the toads would try to mate with other species during these mating frenzies. It is also believed that the females only stay at the breeding pool for about only an hour or so.

In reference to the reproduction of the Holdridge's toad, it was expressed as an “explosive breeder” It acquired this title because it produced eggs in forest floor pools. This species is known to reproduce in big collections in pools in open pastures.

History
Until 2009 the toad had not been observed since 1986. Due to the toad not being observed for over twenty years, the International Union for Conservation of Nature declared the species extinct.
Between 1968 and 2009 there were no sightings of Holdridge's toad in their natural environment. Extensive searches were led to determine if the species was extinct. The searches lasted for seven years before the toad was declared extinct. Multiple causes are believed to have led to the toad's presumed extinction, including chytridiomycosis, climate change, and deforestation. The main threat to Holdridge's toad is thought to be chytridiomycosis, a fungal pathogen, Batrachochytrium dendrobatidis, that causes an infections disease in amphibians. The fungus keratinizes any keratin-containing skin layers in both the tadpoles and adult frogs. High levels of this fungus were detected in the breeding grounds of Holdridge's toad before and after the species appeared to vanish. In 2009, tadpole and adult toads were discovered in two separate ponds that reclassified the species as critically endangered.

From 2008 to 2010, there was extensive searching efforts for the species. The search suggested that the adult population is less than 50 mature individuals, leading to its listing as Critically Endangered.
Juveniles were found, indicating relatively recent reproductive activity, but no large aggregations were seen; this species should be considered Critically Endangered. The entire known range of Incilius holdridgei falls within a protected area: Parque Nacional Braulio Carrillo. However, breeding ponds in Alto El Roble are near the main road and may be under threat from increasing tourism.

Conservation efforts
The toad was added to the Red List of Endangered Species in 2006. Of the forty recorded visits, Holdridge's toad has been observed on twenty-two occasions, accounting for sixty-seven organisms. Much of the known range of this species is protected in Parque Nacional Braulio Carrillo, 20 km north-east of the capital of San José. The two sites where the species is known to persist in 2010 are located in the Cerro Dantos and Jaguarundi Refuges, neither of which has the same protection status as a national park. Even with the lower protection status, the forest cover of these refuges remains intact and seemingly not threatened. Although one might think that the population of Incilius holdridgei is 
recovering, information on the only known populations is still very limited; there needs to be more research on  the population dynamics, environmental factors of the breeding sites, population health and genetics.

A monitoring project is being carried out under the auspices of the Foundation Mohamed Bin Zayed Species Conservation Fund.

It is believed that the major cause of the toad's decrease in population is chytridiomycosis, an infectious disease that affects amphibians caused by the chytrid fungus. The increase of the chytrid fungus has been connected to global warming.

References

Further reading

  (2004) The history of a Nearctic colonization: Molecular phylogenetics and biogeography of the Nearctic toads (Bufo). Evolution 58: 2517–2535. 
 Abarca, J.; G. Chaves, A. García-Rodríguez and R. Vargas. 2010. Reconsidering extinction: Rediscovery of Incilius holdridgei (Anura, Bufonidae) in Costa Rica After 25 years. Herpetological review. 41(2): 150–152.
 Abarca, J. 2012. Conservation Status and Ecological Notes of the Previously Extinct Toad Incilius holdridgei (Taylor, 1952), Costa Rica. Froglog 20(3): 10–12.

External links

 Photo at The Guardian

holdridgei
Endemic fauna of Costa Rica
Amphibians of Costa Rica
Amphibians described in 1952